Qaumi Duniya Daily is a daily Urdu language newspaper published in Delhi and Patna. It is headquartered in New Delhi.  The print version of Qaumi Duniya Daily was launched in 2009 and its e-paper in 2014. 

The paper covers political, social, sporting, economics and other news, particularly focusing on Central Asian countries.  It provides its readers with international news and  discussions on local issues.

References 

Reference= www.rni.nic.in

Urdu-language newspapers published in India
Newspapers published in Delhi
Newspapers established in 2009
2009 establishments in Delhi